Rick Timperi (born 30 May 1967) is an Australian boxer. He competed at the 1992 Summer Olympics and the 1996 Summer Olympics.

References

External links
 

1967 births
Living people
Australian male boxers
Olympic boxers of Australia
Boxers at the 1992 Summer Olympics
Boxers at the 1996 Summer Olympics
Boxers from Rome
Light-heavyweight boxers